The 1998–99 NBA season was the Nuggets' 23rd season in the National Basketball Association, and 32nd season as a franchise. On March 23, 1998, the owners of all 29 NBA teams voted 27–2 to reopen the league's collective bargaining agreement, seeking changes to the league's salary cap system, and a ceiling on individual player salaries. The National Basketball Players Association (NBPA) opposed to the owners' plan, and wanted raises for players who earned the league's minimum salary. After both sides failed to reach an agreement, the owners called for a lockout, which began on July 1, 1998, putting a hold on all team trades, free agent signings and training camp workouts, and cancelling many NBA regular season and preseason games. Due to the lockout, the NBA All-Star Game, which was scheduled to be played in Philadelphia on February 14, 1999, was also cancelled. However, on January 6, 1999, NBA commissioner David Stern, and NBPA director Billy Hunter finally reached an agreement to end the lockout. The deal was approved by both the players and owners, and was signed on January 20, ending the lockout after 204 days. The regular season began on February 5, and was cut short to just 50 games instead of the regular 82-game schedule.

After their dreadful season, where they finished with the league's worst record at 11–71, the Nuggets received the third overall pick the 1998 NBA draft, and selected Raef LaFrentz from the University of Kansas. During the off-season, the team acquired Nick Van Exel from the Los Angeles Lakers, acquired second-year guard Chauncey Billups from the Toronto Raptors, and acquired second-year forward Johnny Taylor, and top draft pick Keon Clark from the Orlando Magic.

Despite the return of Antonio McDyess, who was re-signed by the team after one season with the Phoenix Suns, the Nuggets continued to struggle under new head coach Mike D'Antoni, losing eight of their first nine games. Things would get worse as LaFrentz suffered a knee injury after only just twelve games, and was out for the remainder of the season, averaging 13.8 points, 7.6 rebounds and 1.4 blocks per game. Without their top draft pick, the Nuggets lost their final seven games, and finished sixth in the Midwest Division with a 14–36 record. The Nuggets had the worst team defensive rating in the NBA.

McDyess had a stellar season averaging 21.2 points, 10.7 rebounds and 2.3 blocks per game, and was named to the All-NBA Third Team, while Van Exel averaged 16.5 points and 7.4 assists per game, and Billups provided the team with 13.9 points per game. In addition, second-year forward Danny Fortson stepped into the lineup in LaFrentz's absence, averaging 11.0 points and 11.6 rebounds per game, while Eric Williams and Cory Alexander both contributed 7.3 points per game each off the bench, and Bryant Stith provided with 7.0 points per game.

This was also the Nuggets' final season playing at McNichols Sports Arena before moving to the Pepsi Center the following season. Also following the season, Fortson, Williams and second-year guard Eric Washington were all traded to the Boston Celtics, and D'Antoni was fired as head coach.

Draft picks

Roster

Roster Notes
 Head coach Mike D'Antoni holds American and Italian dual citizenship. He played for the Italian national team although he was born in the United States.
 Rookie shooting guard Kelly McCarty holds American and Russian dual citizenship. He played for the Russian national team although he was born in the United States.

Regular season

Season standings

z - clinched division title
y - clinched division title
x - clinched playoff spot

Record vs. opponents

Game log

Player statistics

Regular season

Player Statistics Citation:

Awards and records
 Antonio McDyess, All-NBA Third Team

Transactions

References

See also
 1998-99 NBA season

Denver Nuggets seasons
1998 in sports in Colorado
1999 in sports in Colorado
Denver Nug